Women's ice hockey tournaments have been staged at the Olympic Games since 1998. Eight goaltenders and fifty-three skaters have played for Canada.

Men's ice hockey had been introduced at the 1920 Summer Olympics, and added to the Winter Olympic Games in 1924. In July 1992, the International Olympic Committee (IOC) voted to approve women's hockey as an Olympic event to first be held at the 1998 Winter Olympics. Until 1998, women's hockey had been dominated by Canada's national team. Canadian teams had won every World Championship; however, by 1997, the American team had improved and was evenly matched with Canada. In thirteen games played between the two teams in 1997, Canada won seven and the United States won six. Canada and the United States dominated the preliminary round of the 1998 tournament, and in their head-to-head match up, the United States won 7–4. The two teams met in the gold medal final, which the United States won 3–1. The Canadian and American teams continued their rivalry, and in a rematch between the two at the 2002 Winter Olympics, Canada won 3–2. In 2006, the Canadian team started the tournament by outscoring opponents 36–1 over three games. American defenceman Angela Ruggiero accused the team of running up the score and warned that the event's Olympic status could be called into question due to a perceived lack of competitive teams. In the final, Canada beat Sweden to claim their second consecutive gold medal. In 2010, the Canadian and American teams outscored opponents in the preliminary round by 41-2 and 31-1 margins, respectively. This brought on more criticism about uneven competition. René Fasel said the IIHF would consider adding a mercy rule to future tournaments. In the gold medal game, Canada defeated the American team 2-0 to win their third consecutive gold. In 2014, the talent disparity had gotten smaller, with Canada and the United States only outscoring their opponents 11-2 and 14-4 in the preliminary round, respectfully. Nevertheless, Canada and the United States once again faced off in the gold medal game. Canada, on the shoulders of two goals from Marie-Philip Poulin came back from a 3-2 deficit late in the 3rd period to claim the gold medal for the fourth consecutive time. In 2018, the United States had their own come-from-behind victory, winning their first gold medal in 20 years. The deciding goal came in a shootout on a beautiful move by American forward Jocelyne Lamoureux.

Canada has won four gold medals and two silver medals in women's hockey.  The Canadian Olympic Hall of Fame has inducted the 2002 and 2006 gold medal winning teams. Cassie Campbell was the first female hockey player inducted into Canada's Sports Hall of Fame or any national hall of fame in 2007. Hayley Wickenheiser will be inducted into the International Ice Hockey Federation (IIHF) Hall of Fame in May 2019. Two women have participated in five tournaments and won five medals (four gold and one silver)—Jayna Hefford, and Hayley Wickenheiser. Wickenheiser is the all-time leading scorer in the women's tournament at the Olympics, with 18 goals, 33 assists and 51 points.

Key

Goaltenders

Skaters

See also

List of Olympic men's ice hockey players for Canada
List of Olympic women's ice hockey players for Finland
List of Olympic women's ice hockey players for the United States

Notes

References

External links
 Hockey Canada - Official website
 2010 Olympic Team - Hockey Canada
 Olympic Review and Revue Olympique - LA84 Foundation

Canada
Canada
 
Canada women's national ice hockey team
Oly
 
ice hockey
Ice hockey
Lists of Canadian sportswomen
Canada